Michael Jay Burton (born July 3, 1947) is an American swimmer, three-time Olympic champion, and former world record-holder in two freestyle distance events.

When he was an eighth grader he was hit by a furniture truck while riding a bicycle with a friend. Earlier he loved to play football and basketball, but the injuries due to this accident made him abandon contact sports, and left swimming as one of the few fitness options.

Burton graduated from El Camino High School. He won 10 AAU titles, and while at UCLA Burton was a NCCAA champion five times. These included the 500 Free (1970), 1650 Free (1967, 1968, 1970), and 200 Fly (1970), which also became an All-American for these events. Burton was also a four-time Pac-10 champion, he helped lead the Bruins to the Pac-10 Championship Team Title in 1970. He enter the UCLA Athletics Hall of Fame as a Character Member.   At the 1967 University Games in Tokyo, Japan, he won a gold medal in the 1,500-meter freestyle, ahead of Russian Semyon Belits-Geiman.

Burton won two gold medals in individual events at the 1968 Summer Olympics in Mexico City: the 400-meter freestyle and 1,500-meter freestyle.  Four years later at the 1972 Summer Olympics in Munich, Germany, he became the only American ever to repeat as the 1,500-meter freestyle gold medalist, and he also recaptured the world record in the process. Burton's repeat proved a stunning win: in the spring of 1972, Burton had been diagnosed with a vitamin deficiency, and at the U.S. Olympic Trials had barely made the Olympic Team. The Olympic Trials were held in Chicago, Burton failed to make the Olympic team in the 400 freestyle event and the 200 butterflies. On the next to the last day of the Trials, he snuck into the finals of the 1500 when he finished eighth. Burton manager to be able to finish in third to make the team (at the time, a country could enter up to three athletes per event in swimming).

At the Munich Games, Burton loved to start out fast and was the early leader even over Australian star Graham Windeatt. Yet, Windeatt fought back and regained the lead. Burton overtook Windeatt on the closing lengths, broke Rick DeMont's world record and won the gold medal for himself and the United States.

The celebration in Munich of his historic repeat, however, was overshadowed by Mark Spitz's performance at those Games and by the terrorist attack on the Olympic Village, which occurred the day after his race.

Burton coached at The Evergreen Swim Team in Olympia, WA until 1997, and then at the Seahawks in Billings, Montana, at the local YMCA until 2007.  His daughter Loni embarked on her own successful swimming career.  She is one of two swimmers in NCAA history to win twelve individual titles.  She performed the feat in three years as Division II swimmers are eligible to participate in four individual events versus three in Division I and III.

He was inducted into the International Swimming Hall of Fame as an "Honor Swimmer" in 1977.

See also

 List of multiple Olympic gold medalists
 List of multiple Olympic gold medalists in one event
 List of Olympic medalists in swimming (men)
 List of University of California, Los Angeles people
 World record progression 800 metres freestyle
 World record progression 1500 metres freestyle

References

1947 births
Living people
American male butterfly swimmers
American male freestyle swimmers
World record setters in swimming
Olympic gold medalists for the United States in swimming
Sportspeople from Billings, Montana
Sportspeople from Des Moines, Iowa
Swimmers at the 1967 Pan American Games
Swimmers at the 1968 Summer Olympics
Swimmers at the 1972 Summer Olympics
UCLA Bruins men's swimmers
Medalists at the 1972 Summer Olympics
Medalists at the 1968 Summer Olympics
Pan American Games gold medalists for the United States
Pan American Games bronze medalists for the United States
Pan American Games medalists in swimming
Universiade medalists in swimming
Universiade gold medalists for the United States
Universiade silver medalists for the United States
Universiade bronze medalists for the United States
Medalists at the 1965 Summer Universiade
Medalists at the 1967 Summer Universiade
Medalists at the 1967 Pan American Games